The  2019 Yamanashi gubernatorial election was held on 27 January 2019 to elect the next governor of Yamanashi.

Candidates 
Hitoshi Goto, incumbent, endorsed by CDP, DPFP. He was also backed by LDP and Komeito in 2015.
Kotaro Nagasaki, former House of Representatives, endorsed by LDP and Komeito.
Hitoshi Hanada, JCP.
Harunobu Yonenaga, former upper house member for DPJ but went over to YP.

Results

References

External links 
- http://www.pref.yamanashi.jp.f.aao.hp.transer.com/kensei/senkyo/index.html

Official websites 

Gubernatorial elections in Japan
2019 elections in Japan
Politics of Yamanashi Prefecture